20 Dynamic Hits is a compilation album released on vinyl by K-Tel in 1972. It reached number 1 in the UK and was the first album put together specifically for telemarketing in that country. At a time when various artists compilations were eligible for inclusion on the UK's Official Album Chart, this was the biggest selling album of 1972.

Track listing
Argent – Hold Your Head Up
The Fortunes – Storm in a Teacup
Deep Purple – Fireball
Danyel Gérard – Butterfly
Ronnie Dyson – When You Get Right Down To It
Cilla Black – Something Tells Me (Something's Gonna Happen Tonight)
Redbone – The Witch Queen of New Orleans
The Move – Tonight
Colin Blunstone – Say You Don't Mind
The Congregation – Softly Whispering I Love You
Hurricane Smith – Oh, Babe, What Would You Say?
Deep Purple – Black Night
Christie – Iron Horse
Sly and The Family Stone – Family Affair
Santana – Everybody's Everything
New World – Tom-Tom Turnaround
Fame & Price – Rosetta
Blue Mink – Banner Man
Hurricane Smith – Don't Let It Die
Blood, Sweat & Tears – Go Down Gamblin'

References

1972 compilation albums
Rock compilation albums
K-tel compilation albums